Declan Buckley is an Irish television personality and drag queen from Dublin, Ireland, going by the persona Shirley Temple Bar. This name is a play on both Shirley Temple and a cultural area of Dublin city called Temple Bar. He also writes a weekly column in national newspaper, The Star on Sunday. He has a business degree from DCU. He featured on several documentaries for Irish and British television, an Irish language programme by broadcaster TG4 was nominated for an Irish Film and Television Award in 2003.

A 1997 winner of the Alternative Miss Ireland competition which helped ignite his career, Buckley hosts a weekly bingo and drag show in Dublin's largest gay bar, The George.

In 2001, he caused a stir when Shirley Temple Bar took over the National Lottery gameshow, Telly Bingo, on Irish television. In 2004, Buckley began to present the show as himself.

References

Year of birth missing (living people)
Living people
20th-century Irish LGBT people
21st-century Irish LGBT people
Alumni of Dublin City University
Irish columnists
Irish television personalities
Irish gay writers
Irish LGBT broadcasters
Irish drag queens